Gurumurthy, is an Indian film and television actor working in Kannada cinema. After having worked in small roles in the television series, he rose to fame with the popular series Lakumi aired on the Asianet Suvarna. Following this, he made his big screen lead debut with Cyber Yugadol Navayuva Prema Kavyam (2014). His breakthrough came with his second film in a lead role, First Rank Raju (2015) for which he received both critical acclaim and commercial success.

Early life 
Gurunandan was born in Mudigere, Chikkamagaluru District, Karnataka. After his 8th grade in school, he ran away from his house to Bangalore to try his luck in cinema.

Career

Films
Gurunandan ventured into mainstream cinema with a lead role in an experimental romantic film Cyber Yugadol Nava Yuva Madhura Prema Kavyam opposite Shwetha Srivatsav. His performance was noted and he earned a nomination at the SIIMA awards for his debut. However, the film underperformed at the box-office. His next release was the comedy film First Rank Raju (2015) which turned both critical and commercial success.

Filmography

References

External links 

 Gurunandan Profile
 Gurunandan Facebook page

21st-century Indian male actors
Living people
Indian male film actors
Indian male television actors
People from Chikkamagaluru district
Male actors from Bangalore
Male actors in Kannada cinema
1989 births